Diamond Harbour is a town and a municipality of the South 24 Parganas district in the Indian state of West Bengal. It is situated on the eastern banks of the Hooghly River. It is the headquarters of the Diamond Harbour subdivision.

History
Diamond Harbour was originally known as Hajipur, as it was situated on the banks of the Hajipur creek. The name Diamond Harbour was applied by the British, who used it for both river and sea shipping.

Geography

Area overview
Diamond Harbour subdivision is a rural subdivision with patches of urbanisation. Only 14.61% of the population lives in the urban areas and an overwhelming 85.39% lives in the rural areas. In the western portion of the subdivision (shown in the map alongside) there are 11 census towns. The entire district is situated in the Ganges Delta and the western part, located on the east bank of the Hooghly River, is covered by the Kulpi Diamond Harbour Plain, which is 5–6 metres above sea level. Archaeological excavations at Deulpota and Harinarayanpur, on the bank of the Hooghly River indicate the existence of human habitation more than 2,000 years ago.

Note: The map alongside presents some of the notable locations in the subdivision. All places marked in the map are linked in the larger full screen map.

Location

Climate
Köppen-Geiger climate classification system classifies its climate as tropical wet and dry (Aw).

The overall climate of Diamond harbour is warm and humid. The summer temperature often crosses 35 °C when it drops 15 °C. The highest temperature ever was 43.0 °C, recorded on 21 May 2002. The lowest temperature dropped was 8.2 °C, on 13 January 2003. The annual average rainfall is 1600 mm. The air is moderately humid, around 76%.

Demographics

According to the 2011 Census of India, Diamond Harbour had a total population of 41,802, of which 21,050 were males and 20,752 were females. There were 3,688 people in the age range of 0 to 6 years. The total number of literate people was 32,753, which constituted 78.4% of the population with male literacy of 81.7% and female literacy of 75.0%. The effective literacy (7+) of population over 6 years of age was 85.9%, of which male literacy rate was 89.6% and female literacy rate was 82.2%. The Scheduled Castes and Scheduled Tribes population was 5,221 and 72 respectively. Diamond Harbour had a total of 10,048 households as of 2011.

According to the 2001 Census of India, Diamond Harbour had a total population of 37,234. Males constitute 51% of the population and females 49%. It has an average literacy rate of 72%, higher than the national average of 59.5%: male literacy is 77%, and female literacy is 67%. 10% of the population is under 6 years of age.

Civic administration

Municipality
It has jurisdiction over parts of the Diamond Harbour. It is divided into 16 wards. According to the 2022 municipal election, it is being controlled by the All India Trinamool Congress.

Police stations
It has jurisdiction over parts of the Diamond Harbour Municipality, and the Diamond Harbour I and Diamond Harbour II CD blocks.

Diamond Harbour women police station has jurisdiction over parts of the Diamond Harbour Municipality, and the Diamond Harbour I and Diamond Harbour II CD blocks.

CD block HQ
The headquarters of the Diamond Harbour I CD block are located at Diamond Harbour.

Economy
Kolkata Port Trust is considering construction of cargo-handling jetties at Diamond Harbour.

Transport
Diamond Harbour is on the National Highway 12.

Diamond Harbour railway station is on the Sealdah–Diamond Harbour line of the Kolkata Suburban Railway system.

Commuters
With the electrification of the railways, suburban traffic has grown tremendously since the 1960s. As of 2005–06, more than 1.7 million (17 lakhs) commuters use the Kolkata Suburban Railway system daily. After the partition of India, refugees from East Pakistan/ Bangladesh had a strong impact on the development of urban areas in the periphery of Kolkata. The new immigrants depended on Kolkata for their livelihood, thus increasing the number of commuters. Eastern Railway runs 1,272 EMU trains daily.

Education

 Diamond Harbour Government Medical College and Hospital, established in 2019, is a full-fledged tertiary referral government medical college.
 Diamond Harbour Government Polytechnic, established in 2014, offers diploma, undergraduate and postgraduate degree courses in Engineering and Technology and other allied fields.
 Diamond Harbour Women's University, established in 2013, is the first university of the state for women.
 Fakir Chand College, established in 1948, is affiliated with the University of Calcutta. It offers honours courses in Bengali, English, Sanskrit, history, political science, philosophy, economics, geography, education, mathematics and accounting & finance, and general degree courses in arts, science, and accounting & finance.
 Diamond Harbour High School

Healthcare
Diamond Harbour Subdivisional Hospital, with 250 beds, is the major government medical facility in the Diamond Harbour subdivision.

References

External links
 
 

Ports and harbours of West Bengal
Cities and towns in South 24 Parganas district
Diamond Harbour